Let's Go Go Christmas is a compilation album released on December 12, 1995.  The album consist go-go renditions of traditional Christmas carols performed by prominent Washington, D.C.-based go-go bands, including the songs "Santa Claus Is Coming to Town" performed by The Pleasure Band, and "Merry Christmas Baby" performed by Chuck Brown & the Soul Searchers.

Track listing

Personnel
Adapted from AllMusic

Matt Allen – keyboards
Roy Battle – keyboards, trombone
Greg Boyer – trombone
Chuck Brown – electric guitar, vocals
Kim Clarke – trumpet, vocals
Benny Cowan – trumpet
Double Agent Rock – primary artist
Glenn Ellis – bass guitar
Rory Felton – vocals
Donnell Floyd – vocals
Funk Innovators –  primary artist
The Go-Go Family –  primary artist
Milton "Go-Go Mickey" Freeman – congas, percussions
Ivan Goff – keyboards, vocals
Robert Green – congas, percussions
Hot, Cold Sweat – primary artist
James "Jas Funk" Thomas – vocals
Andre "Whiteboy" Johnson - electric guitar
William "Ju Ju" House – drums, percussion
Junk Yard Band – primary artist
Michael Muse – vocals
Louie Oxley – keyboards
The Pleasure Band – primary artist
Rare Essence – primary artist

References

1995 compilation albums
1995 Christmas albums
All-star recordings
Christmas albums by American artists
Go-go albums